Brazil–Mozambique relations refers to the bilateral relations between Brazil and Mozambique. Both nations are members of the Community of Portuguese Language Countries, Group of 77 and the United Nations.

History
Both Brazil and Mozambique were united for three hundred years as part of the Portuguese Empire. As part of the Portuguese Empire, Brazil received thousands of Mozambicans who arrived to the country as slaves. From 1815 to 1822, Mozambique was administered from Brazil during the Transfer of the Portuguese Court to Brazil.

From September 1964 - September 1974, Mozambique was at war with Portugal during its war of independence. In December 1973, Brazil voted in favor of the United Nations Resolution 3117 on the elimination of colonialism in Southern Africa. On 25 June 1975, Mozambique obtained its independence. On 15 November 1975, Brazil recognized and established diplomatic relations with Mozambique.

In March 1976, Brazil opened an embassy in the Mozambican capital of Maputo and in January 1998, Mozambique reciprocated the gesture by opening an embassy in Brasília. In 2000, Brazilian President Fernando Henrique Cardoso paid an official visit to Mozambique and attended the 3rd summit of the Community of Portuguese Language Countries being held in the Mozambican capital. In 2001, Mozambican President Joaquim Chissano paid an official visit to Brazil. Since then, there have been several high level visits between leaders of both nations.

High-level visits

High-level visits from Brazil to Mozambique

 President Fernando Henrique Cardoso (2000)
 President Luiz Inácio Lula da Silva (2003, 2010)
 President Dilma Rousseff (2011, 2012)
 Foreign Minister Mauro Vieira (2015)

High-level visits from Mozambique to Brazil

 President Joaquim Chissano (2001, 2002, 2004)
 President Armando Guebuza (2007, 2009)
 Prime Minister Aires Ali (2012)

Agreements
Brazil and Mozambique have signed several bilateral agreements such as agreements on cooperation in health, education, social policies and public security (2001). In 2010, both nations signed agreements on air service cooperation and for mutual recognition of driver's license. In 2015, both nations signed an agreement on cooperation and investment facilitation.

Economic relations
In 2004, Brazil agreed to forgive 95% of Mozambique's debt to Brazil totaling US$280 million. 

In 2017, trade between Brazil and Mozambique totaled US$169 million. In 2010, Brazil opened an anti-retroviral medicine plant in Mozambique. In 2016, Brazilian investments in Mozambique reached US$10 billion, mainly in the mining, construction and agriculture industries. Brazilian multinational companies such as Andrade Gutierrez, Odebrecht, Petrobras and Vale operate in Mozambique.

Mozambique is the largest recipient of Brazilian aid from the national aid agency Agência Brasileira de Cooperação.

Resident diplomatic missions
 Brazil has an embassy in Maputo.
 Mozambique has an embassy in Brasília and a consulate in Belo Horizonte.

See also
 Lusophone Games
 United Kingdom of Portugal, Brazil and the Algarves

References

Bibliography 

 
Mozambique
Bilateral relations of Mozambique